The sack of Rome of May 1084 was a Norman sack, the result of the pope's call for aid from the duke of Apulia, Robert Guiscard. 

Pope Gregory VII was besieged in the Castel Sant'Angelo by the Holy Roman Emperor Henry IV in June 1083. He held out and called for aid from Guiscard, who was then fighting the Byzantine Emperor Alexios I Komnenos in the Balkans. He returned, however, to the Italian Peninsula and marched north with 36,000 men. He entered Rome and forced Henry to retreat, but a riot of the citizens led to a three days sack, after which Guiscard escorted the pope to the Lateran. The Normans had mainly pillaged the old city, which was then one of the richest cities in Italy. After days of unending violence, the Romans rose up causing the Normans to set fire to the city. Many of the buildings of Rome were gutted on the Capitoline and Palatine hills along with the area between the Colosseum and the Lateran. In the end the ravaged Roman populace succumbed to the Normans.

See also
 Italo-Normans
 History of Rome

References 

Rome 1084
Rome 1084
Rome 1084
Medieval Rome
1084 in Europe
Conflicts in 1084
Military history of Rome
11th century in the Papal States